University of New Hampshire Observatory  is an astronomical observatory owned and operated by the University of New Hampshire.  It is located in Durham, New Hampshire (USA) near the old Durham Reservoir.  The main telescope is a  Schmidt–Cassegrain reflecting telescope donated to the observatory in 1984.  It is used only for educational purposes.

See also 
 List of observatories

References

External links
 UNH Observatory at the University of New Hampshire
 UNH Observatory Clear Sky Chart Forecasts of observing conditions.

Astronomical observatories in New Hampshire
Observatory
Buildings and structures in Strafford County, New Hampshire
University and college buildings completed in 1984
1984 establishments in New Hampshire